Maloney House is a historic home located at Lockport in Niagara County, New York.  It is a two-story stone structure built about 1860 by Patrick Maloney, an early settler of Lockport, in the Greek Revival style.  It is one of approximately 75 stone residences remaining in the city of Lockport.

It was listed on the National Register of Historic Places in 2003.

References

Houses on the National Register of Historic Places in New York (state)
Greek Revival houses in New York (state)
Houses completed in 1860
Houses in Niagara County, New York
National Register of Historic Places in Niagara County, New York